Chestnut pie is a pie prepared with chestnuts as a primary ingredient. It is a part of the cuisine of Italy, where it has been documented as dating back to the 15th century. It is also a part of the cuisine of the Southern United States. Shelled whole or chopped chestnuts may be used, which may be boiled or roasted. A chestnut purée may also be used. It may be prepared as a savory or sweet pie.

History
Chestnut pie has been documented back to the 15th century in Italy, in the book De honesta voluptate et valetudine ("On honourable pleasure and health") written by the Italian writer and gastronomist Bartolomeo Platina. Platina's recipe, titled torta ex castaneís, called for the use of boiled and ground chestnuts in the pie. The chestnuts were ground using a mortar and pestle, milk was added and then the mixture was strained. After this step, the ingredients for a spelt tart were added. The use of saffron was recommended to add coloration to the dish.

In the 16th century, the pie was prepared and documented by Bartolomeo Scappi in his 1570 book Opera dell'arte del cucinare, which was focused upon Italian Renaissance cuisine. The recipe included the use of dried and fresh chestnuts in the pie. Scappi's recipe recommended using chestnuts that were not entirely ripened, gathered in August.

An 1858 recipe for sweet chestnut pie uses chestnuts glazed with orange flowers, in the dish's preparation, which are placed inside the pie.

A 1908 recipe for a savory chestnut pie uses shelled chestnuts, Spanish onion, haricot stock, salt and pepper.

Savory chestnut pie
Savory chestnut pie may be prepared with various additional ingredients such as mushrooms, garlic onion, celery, leeks and butternut squash, among others. A 1915 recipe uses boiled and shelled chestnuts, canned mushrooms, a white sauce and a biscuit dough in preparation of the dish.

Sweet chestnut pie
Sweet chestnut pie may be prepared as a cream pie. Chocolate may be used as an ingredient in sweet chestnut pie. It may be served topped with whipped cream.

See also

 Cashew pie
 Chestnut cake
 List of Italian dishes
 List of pies, tarts and flans
 Peanut pie
 Walnut pie

Notes

References

Chestnut dishes
Cuisine of the Southern United States
Italian cuisine
Pies
Sweet pies
Savoury pies